The Battle of Chakan was fought between the Marathas and the Mughal Empire in the year 1660. The Mughal army advancing towards Pune had to overcome the fort of Chakan around 30 km from the city.

The fort of Chakan was a Bhuikot, i.e. a land fort and was occupied by around 800 infantry. Mughal forces laid siege to the fort hoping for a quick surrender by the numerically inferior Maratha garrison. However the Mughal artillery was unable to force the fort into submission. Several assaults by the Mughals were repulsed with high casualties. 

After almost two and half months without success the Mughals finally resorted to mining the Buruj or tower of the fort. With the towers demolished the Maratha force agreed to come to terms. The remainder of garrison withdrew from the fort.

Aftermath

The Mughal commander Shaista Khan was surprised with the prolonged resistance offered at the relatively small fort. The siege revealed glaring shortcomings of Mughal army like poor strategy and tactics and overconfidence. These were exploited by the Marathas when they routed a Mughal force deployed in Konkan, and again during the most celebrated strike at Shaista Khan's camp in Pune. After this battle, Aurangzeb continued to keep Shaista Khan as commander-in-force of the Mughal Army in the Deccan however he soon dismissed him to the province of Bengal after his camp in the Lal Mahal was attacked by Shivaji.

References

Chakan
Chakan
Chakan
1660 in India